Polynoncus bullatus is a species of hide beetle in the subfamily Omorginae found in Chile and Argentina.

References

bullatus
Beetles described in 1845